Ra Vincent (born ) is a New Zealand production designer, set decorator and artist. He is best known for his work on The Hobbit trilogy (2012–2014) and Jojo Rabbit (2019). His accolades include a Hollywood Film Award and a Saturn Award, in addition to nominations for a BAFTA Award, two Academy Awards and two Critics' Choice Movie Awards.

Biography 
Vincent is Māori of the iwi Te Atiawa and in addition to his screen work he has produced a number of public sculptures. He started training as an artist in 1997 at the Nelson Marlborough Institute of Technology. His father Bohdi Vincent is also an artist and sculptor and introduced his son to sculpting when he was growing up.

Public art works 

 Pou Whenua (2004) at Wai-titi Landing next to the New Zealand government buildings in Thorndon
 Waka Pou (2007) at Waitangi Park commissioned by Wellington Waterfront Ltd and presented by the Tenths Trust
 Anchor Stone (2004), Te Ngākau Civic Square, Wellington
 Kaitiaki – Paraparaumu Library

Partial filmography

As production designer
 What We Do in the Shadows (2014) 
 Thor: Ragnarok (2017)
 Jojo Rabbit (2019)
 Our Flag Means Death (TV series, 2022)
 Next Goal Wins (post-production, 2023)

As set decorator
 The Hobbit: An Unexpected Journey (2012)
 The Hobbit: The Desolation of Smaug (2013)
 The Hobbit: The Battle of the Five Armies (2014)
 Alice Through the Looking Glass (2016)

References

External links
 

Living people
Year of birth missing (living people)
Place of birth missing (living people)
New Zealand production designers
Set decorators
21st-century New Zealand people